is a Japanese professional footballer who plays as a forward for Yokohama FC.

References

External links

1996 births
Living people
Japanese footballers
Association football forwards
Yokohama FC players
J1 League players
J2 League players